Clavus may refer to:
 Claudius Clavus (born 1388), 15th-century Danish cartographer
 Clavus (gastropod), a genus of snails in the family Drilliidae
 The Roman clavus, a reddish-purple stripe on garments that distinguished members of the senatorial and equestrian orders; see laticlave and angusticlavia
 A shooting pain in the forehead, associated with hysteria, also called clavus hystericus
 Corn (medicine), type of callus formed on the toes
 The plant disease ergot
 The pseudo-tail of the Molidae (sunfish)
 In Hemiptera, a usually narrow strip of the hemelytron adjacent to the scutellum

See also
 Clav (disambiguation)